Jeff Pierce (born August 28, 1958) is a retired American professional road bicycle racer.  At the 1987 Tour de France, Pierce gained fame by becoming the third American (after Davis Phinney and Greg LeMond) to win a stage in the Tour de France, winning the final stage on the Champs-Élysées from the breakaway while riding for Team 7-Eleven.

In 1991, Jeff Pierce appeared in a video with Olympic cyclist John Howard, entitled John Howard's Lessons in Cycling. 

After his retirement from competitive cycling, Pierce served as USA Cycling's Vice President of Athletics.

He was inducted into the United States Bicycling Hall of Fame in 2020.

Major results

1980
 1st Overall Tour of Kansas City
1985
 1st Overall Tour de Berlin
 1st Nevada City Classic
 1st Stage 10 Coors Classic
1986
 1st Overall Vuelta a Bisbee
1st Stages 2, 3, & 5
 3rd Overall Redlands Bicycle Classic
 6th Overall Coors Classic
1987
 1st Stage 25 Tour de France
 1st Overall Tour of Texas
1st Prologue
 1st Athens Twilight Criterium
 2nd Overall Coors Classic
1988
 1st Stages 1 & 6 Coors Classic
1989
 1st Stage 4 Tour of the Basque Country
1994
 2nd Overall Redlands Bicycle Classic
1st Stage 2

References

External links 

Official Tour de France results for Jeff Pierce

1958 births
American male cyclists
American Tour de France stage winners
Tour de France Champs Elysées stage winners
Living people